W. Kordes' Söhne (en. W. Kordes' Sons) is a German rose breeding company in Klein Offenseth-Sparrieshoop in Schleswig-Holstein, Germany. The company is one of the world's leading rose breeders and producers for cut roses and garden roses, annually selling worldwide more than two million rose plants at retail and wholesale. Each year, more than 50,000 new crosses of garden roses and cut roses are tested, leading to four to six marketable varieties after a trial period of eight to ten years.

History

Wilhelm Kordes I (born 1865 in Holstein, Germany, died 1935 in Klein Offenseth-Sparrieshoop) was a German horticulturist. In 1887 he created a rose garden in Elmshorn, specializing in growing garden roses. In 1918 he moved the firm to Klein Offenseth-Sparrieshoop in Schleswig-Holstein.

His sons, the breeder Wilhelm Kordes II (born 30 March 1891 in Elmshorn, died 11 November 1976) and Hermann Kordes (1893-1963) changed the name of the expanding company to "Wilhelm Kordes' Söhne". Wilhelm Kordes II's varieties made them one of the biggest rose firms of the twentieth century. His general aim was to breed hardy and healthy varieties for the German climate. After 1920 he concentrated entirely on rose-growing, leaving management to his brother Hermann. By the mid-1930s, the company had grown to considerable size.

[Wilhelm's] experiments focused at first upon the native European species, including Rosa canina, R. rubiginosa, and R. spinosissima: the results include such important shrub roses as 'Harry Maasz' (1939), 'Louis Rödiger' (1935), 'Raubritter' (1936), 'Karl Föster' (1930), and the early-flowering "Frühling" series. He also experimented with the Hybrid Musks such as 'Elmshorn' (1950), 'Erfurt' (1931), and 'Eva' (1933). [His son Reimer later bred 'Iceberg', also a Hybrid Musk.] Hybrid Teas were not neglected: 'Crimson Glory' (1935) had an unusually long reign as the world's favourite crimson rose.

During the Second World War Wilhelm Kordes II crossed the East Asian Rosa wichurana with the Japanese Rosa rugosa eventually to obtain a new species, Rosa kordesii, able to withstand the harsh winters of north Germany. From it he later bred such famous post-war varieties as 'Parkdirektor Riggers,' 'Leverkusen,' Hamburger Phönix' and 'Heidelberg.' "The dark, glossy foliage of many modern roses can be traced back to 'Kordesii'."

Wilhelm Kordes II was also very involved in implementing ADR testing (general testing of new German roses) in 1950, established by the rose breeders in the Federation of German Nurseries.

Above all, it is as a rose breeder than Wilhelm Kordes [II] will be remembered. He and his son Reimer bred some of the world's best-known roses, including 'Crimson Glory' and 'Schneewittchen' ('Iceberg'). Kordes knew that it was through introducing new genes that all the great advances in plant breeding had been achieved. His experiments focused at first upon the native European species and Rosa rugosa; his aim was to develop new bush roses for small gardens.

From 1955, his son Reimer Kordes (February 19, 1922 – 3 February 1997) ran the company until Reimer's son Wilhelm Kordes III (1953-2016) took over in 1977.

Reimer moved on from shrub roses to concentrate on brilliantly coloured Hybrid Teas and Floribundas for private and public gardens. Nevertheless, he introduced roses of every type: large-flowered climbers such as 'Alchymist' (1956) and 'Antike 89' (1988); ground cover roses such as 'Immensee' and 'Sommerwind'; Hybrid Teas including 'Duftzauber 84' (1984) and 'Kupferkönigin' (1996); shrubs such as 'Chiarivari' (1970), 'Lucinde' (1988), and 'Rosenstadt Zweibrücken' (1989); Floribundas such as 'Golden Holstein' (1988) and 'Crimson Bouquet' (1999); and cut-flower roses such as 'Champagner' (1985).

One of the world's best known rose cultivars, 'Iceberg' (syn. 'Schneewittchen') was introduced by Reimer Kordes in 1958. The variety was selected as the "World Favourite Rose" of 1983. Other famous cultivars include 'Sunsprite', and 'Aprikola'.

Sortable list of Kordes rose varieties

References

Bibliography
 W. Kordes Söhne The Kordes firm's website in English

German horticulturists
Rose breeders
German gardeners
1865 births
1935 deaths